Mediator of cell motility 1 is a protein that in humans is encoded by the MEMO1 gene.

References

Further reading